Ryde is an unincorporated community in Sacramento County, California, United States. Ryde has a post office with ZIP code 95680, which was established in 1892. William Kesner planned the community on land he purchased from Judge Williams in 1892; Williams devised the name from Ryde, Isle of Wight.

References

Unincorporated communities in Sacramento County, California
Unincorporated communities in California